Nogar may refer to:
 Nogar, a village in Castrillo de Cabrera municipality, León, Spain
 Nogar Shorq, a village in Hormozgan Province, Iran
Alberto Nogar (1934–2013), a weightlifter from the Philippines